Trigon is a German-based fusion band, and their history is carved by the numerous changes in line-up which contributed to Trigon's creative potential, as the band draws heavily on jamming as a source for their music. The band has also become a regular attraction at various music festivals. These include the Art-Rock Festival, on the "ProgParade", several times on the Burg Herzberg Festival, and at the Zappanale. Internationally, they were for example at the "BajaProg Festival" in Mexicali (Baja California, México) and at the Festival Crescendo near Bordeaux in France. In 2005 they accompanied Nektar at their European tour.

Publications

DVDs 
 Live 2007 (2007)

CDs
 Studio 
 2011 (2011)
 Emergent (2005)
 Continuum (2004)
 Beschränkte Haftung (2000)
 Nova (1990) 
 Live 
 Herzberg 2004 (2004)
 Burg Herzberg Festival 2002 (2002)

Other manifestations

Soundtrack
 Hunting Dragonflies (17. June 2005)
 by Crimson Chain Productions
 Sonderfahrt (August 2004)
 "Bergfilm" of the TU Ilmenau

Sampler / remixes
 Progstravaganza I-IX (14. June 2013)
 CD to the book of eclipsed ROCK - Das Gesamtwerk der größten Rock-Acts (6. April 2013)
 ProgSphere’s Progstravaganza Compilation of Awesomeness – Part 9 (16. February 2012)
 Eclipsed - The Art Of Sysyphus Vol. 62 (2011)
 Zappanale18 Retrospective (2008)
 DVD and CD with extracts of some concerts at the Zappanale18 2007.
 CRESCENDO Festival De Rock Progressive Live 2005 Et 2006 (2007)
 DVD with extracts of some concerts of the years 2005 and 2006
 Eclipsed - Music From Time And Space Vol. 14 (2005)
 assorted [progrock-dt] related music vol. 1 (November 2004)
 Sampler, which collects some in the [progrock-dt] represented bands.
 Portals. Movements. Structures III (July 2004)
 CD set arranged by Lew Fisher of the Progressive Music Society
 23rd Peter - Trigonometrie (February 2004)
 "Based on samples from German prog rock band TRIGON, 23rd Peter gives weird lessons in electronic alchemy."

Games
 CA_DMOilrig - The Oilrig, featuring "Trigon" (2001)
 As a member of Chaotic Dreams and as a former member of Trigon, Kirk Erickson put a Trigon Title ("Dekadenz and corruption") in one of his Quake III maps.

External links
Official website of Trigon
StadtWiki entry (Stadtwiki Karlsruhe)

German progressive rock groups
German stoner rock musical groups
German post-rock groups
Musical groups established in 1989
1989 establishments in Germany